Eupithecia mallecoensis is a moth in the family Geometridae. It is found in the regions of Maule (Curico, Talca and Cauquenes provinces), BioBio (the Province of Bio-Bio), Araucania (Malleco Province) and Los Lagos (Osorno and Chiloe provinces) in Chile. The habitat consists of the Central Coastal Cordillera, Northern Valdivian Forest and the Valdivian Forest biotic provinces.

The length of the forewings is about 9.5 mm for males and 9–10 mm for females. The forewings are greyish brown to dark brown, with grey scaling and with pale reddish brown scaling along the ends of the veins. The hindwings are grey, heavily scaled with greyish brown and dark brown scales. Adults have been recorded on wing from November to February.

Etymology
The specific name is based on the type locality.

References

Moths described in 1987
mallecoensis
Moths of South America
Endemic fauna of Chile